There are 29 counties in the U.S. state of Utah. There were originally seven counties established under the provisional State of Deseret in 1849:  Davis, Iron, Sanpete, Salt Lake, Tooele, Utah, and Weber. The Territory of Utah was created in 1851 with the first territorial legislature meeting from 1851–1852. The first legislature re-created the original counties from the State of Deseret under territorial law as well as establishing three additional counties:  Juab, Millard, and Washington. All other counties were established between 1854 and 1894 by the Utah Territorial Legislature under territorial law except for the last two counties formed, Daggett and Duchesne. They were created by popular vote and by gubernatorial proclamation after Utah became a state. Present-day Duchesne County encompassed an Indian reservation that was created in 1861. The reservation was opened to homesteaders in 1905 and the county was created in 1913. In 1917, all Uintah County residents voted to create Daggett County.

Based on 2021 United States Census data, the population of Utah was 3,337,975. Just over 75% of Utah's population is concentrated along four Wasatch Front counties: Salt Lake, Utah, Davis, and Weber. Salt Lake County was the largest county in the state with a population of 1,186,421, followed by Utah County with 684,986, Davis County with 367,285 and Weber County with 267,066. Daggett County was the least populated with 976 people.

The Federal Information Processing Standard (FIPS) code, which is used by the United States government to uniquely identify states and counties, is provided with each county.  Utah's FIPS code is 49, which when combined with any county code would be written as 49XXX.  In the FIPS code column in the table below, each FIPS code links to the most current census data for that county.

The Utah Code (Title 17, Chapter 50, Part 5) divides the counties into six classes by population:
 First class: Population of 1,000,000 or more. Only one county - Salt Lake - is first class.
 Second class: Population between 175,000 and 1,000,000. Four counties.
 Third class: Population between 40,000 and 175,000. Five counties.
 Fourth class: Population between 11,000 and 40,000. Ten counties.
 Fifth class: Population between 4,000 and 11,000. Five counties.
 Sixth class: Population below 4,000. Four counties.

The county classes, for example, are used in the Utah legislature in crafting of legislation to distinguish between more urban and rural areas, such as important yet subtle distinctions in how revenue can be distributed. Usually, a bill intended to benefit rural counties would target the counties of the fourth, fifth and sixth class.

Under Utah Code (Title 17, Chapter 52a, Part 2), Utah counties are permitted to choose one of four forms of county government: a three-member full-time commission; a five or seven member expanded commission; a three to nine member (odd-numbered) part-time council with a full-time elected county mayor or a three to nine member (odd-numbered) part-time council with a full-time manager appointed by the council. 23 out of 29 counties are ruled by the standard three-member commission. Of the other six, Cache County was the first change in 1988 to a seven-member council with an elected mayor. Grand County adopted a seven-member council with appointed manager in 1992, followed by Morgan County in 1999 and Wasatch County in 2003. In 1998, Salt Lake County residents approved adopting a nine-member council with elected mayor that began work in 2001. Summit County adopted a five-member council with an appointed manager in 2006.



Counties

|}

State of Deseret counties
Great Salt Lake County – original county created January 31, 1850
Iron County – original county created January 31, 1850
Sanpete County – original county created January 31, 1850
Tuilla County – original county created January 31, 1850
Utah County – original county created January 31, 1850
Weber County – original county created January 31, 1850
Davis County – created October 5, 1850 from portions of Great Salt Lake County and Weber County

County name changes
Tuilla County, Deseret created January 31, 1850, re-created as Tooele County, Utah Territory on March 3, 1852.
Great Salt Lake County, Utah Territory created March 3, 1852, name changed to Salt Lake County, Utah Territory on January 29, 1868
Richland County, Utah Territory created January 16, 1854, name changed to Rich County, Utah Territory on January 29, 1868

Former counties
There were ten counties in the Territory of Utah that were absorbed by other states or other Utah counties.

References

Bibliography

External links

Utah

Counties in Utah